Elliot Style (April 1892 – 20 March 1926) was a South African cricketer. He played in four first-class matches for Border from 1910/11 to 1913/14.

See also
 List of Border representative cricketers

References

External links
 

1892 births
1926 deaths
South African cricketers
Border cricketers